Port Moller Airport  is a publicly owned, private-use airport located  northeast of the central business district of Cold Bay, in the Aleutians East Borough of the U.S. state of Alaska. It is owned by the U.S. Department of the Interior, Bureau of Land Management. It was previously known as Port Moller Air Force Station.

Overview
Scheduled airline service to Cold Bay Airport is provided by Peninsula Airways (PenAir). As per Federal Aviation Administration records, this airport had 487 commercial passenger boardings (enplanements) in calendar year 2008, an increase of 14% from the 427 enplanements in 2007.

Although most U.S. airports use the same three-letter location identifier for the FAA and IATA, this airport is assigned 1AK3 by the FAA and PML by the IATA.

Airlines and destinations

Facilities 
It has one runway designated 1/19 with a gravel surface measuring 3,500 by 100 feet (1,067 x 30 m).

History
The airport was built in 1958 to support Port Moller Air Force Station, a Cold War United States Air Force Distant Early Warning Line radar station.  The station was operated by Detachment 4, 714th Aircraft Control and Warning Squadron based at Cold Bay Air Force Station, near Cold Bay, Alaska.   The radar station was deactivated in September 1969, ending military use of the airport.  The Air Force remediated the site around 2000,  removing all abandoned military structures and returning the site to a natural condition.

References

External links 

Airports in Aleutians East Borough, Alaska
Bureau of Land Management